Trial Bay is a broad bay on the Mid North Coast of New South Wales, Australia.  The bay faces northwards and extends from Laggers Point in the east around to Grassy Head to the west, past the town of South West Rocks and the Macleay River mouth.

The bay is named after the brig Trial which was shipwrecked there in 1816.

In 1820 John Oxley explored the area.  He reported Port Macquarie as more favourable for settlement than Trial Bay, though Trial Bay might offer an anchorage while waiting for favourable winds to cross the bar at Port Macquarie.

Trial Bay has a northerly facing and is sheltered from the predominant southerly swells.  There have been various plans over the years to make it a full harbour, protected in all conditions.  Its location in between other sheltered waters of Moreton Bay and Port Stephens recommended such a project.  In the 1880s through to 1900s an attempt at a breakwater was made off Laggers Point.  In the 1960s an oil terminal established near South West Rocks reignited interest in a harbour, but the Department of Public Works concluded the cost would not be warranted. Ships moored in the bay and delivered oil via a pipeline extending approximately 2 km to the terminal operated by Caltex. The terminal is noted as decommissioned in 2003.

It was also a major internment camp during WWI.<OutBack Australia Issue 122 Dec 2018/Jan 2019>

References 

 Valley of the Macleay, Marie H. Neil, 1972,

External links
 Zivil Lager (Internment Camp): World War One Prisoners Of War At Trial Bay (online exhibition)

Bays of New South Wales